A soldier is a thin strip of toasted bread, reminiscent of a soldier on parade. The shape lends itself to dipping into a soft-boiled egg that has had the top removed.

Soldiers are called mouillettes in French, but also Apprête, mouillons, piquettes in French Normand and lichettes in Lorraine Franconian. 

In 2005, The Daily Telegraph reported the invention of a device for cutting bread into soldiers.  Shaped cutters to produce soldiers shaped like human soldiers are also available.

History
In 1868 Alphonse Daudet mentions mouillettes in the novel Le Petit Chose :  "A sa gauche, Annou lui taille des mouillettes pour ses oeufs, des oeufs du matin, blancs, crémeux, duvetés". 
The specific english term "eggs with soldiers" appears to date only from the 1960s. The modern phrase first appeared in print in 1966 in Nicolas Freeling's novel The Dresden Green (where it is used to eat soup). It is possible that it was either popularised or invented in 1965 in a series of TV commercials for eggs starring Tony Hancock and Patricia Hayes.

See also
 List of toast dishes

References

Breads
Toast dishes